Cleomenes was a seer in Alexander's entourage, who in 328 BC interpreted an unfavorable omen for the king at the time of the Cleitus affair. Cleomenes was one of several men who slept in the alleged temple of Serapis at the time of Alexander's fatal illness.

References
Who's Who in the Age of Alexander the Great by Waldemar Heckel 

Seers of Alexander the Great
Ancient Greek seers
4th-century BC Greek people